Oriol Rey Erenas (born 25 February 1998) is a Spanish professional footballer who plays as a midfielder for CD Mirandés.

Club career
Born in Barcelona, Catalonia, Rey joined FC Barcelona's La Masia in 2008, aged ten. On 27 July 2017, he agreed to a two-year contract with EFL Championship side Leeds United.

Rey signed his first professional contract with The Whites on 13 May 2018, and joined Segunda División B side UB Conquense on a season-long loan deal in August. He made his senior debut on 9 September, playing the last 32 minutes of a 1–1 away draw against CF Peralada.

Rey scored his first senior goal on 13 April 2019, netting the last of a 3–0 home win against Valencia CF Mestalla. He ended the season as a regular starter, contributing with one goal in 34 appearances, but his side suffered relegation.

On 18 July 2019, Rey signed a three-year contract with Real Valladolid, being assigned to the reserves also in the third division. He made his first team debut on 16 January 2021, coming on as a substitute for Toni Villa in the extra time of a 4–1 away win against SCR Peña Deportiva, for the season's Copa del Rey.

Rey made his professional debut with the Pucelanos on 26 January 2021, replacing Kike Pérez late into 2–4 home loss to Levante UD also for the national cup. His La Liga debut occurred three days later, as he replaced Míchel in a 1–3 loss against SD Huesca also at the Estadio José Zorrilla.

On 28 July 2021, Rey signed a two-year contract with Segunda División side CD Mirandés.

References

External links
 
 
 

1998 births
Living people
Footballers from Barcelona
Spanish footballers
Association football midfielders
La Liga players
Segunda División B players
UB Conquense footballers
Real Valladolid Promesas players
Real Valladolid players
CD Mirandés footballers
Leeds United F.C. players
Spanish expatriate footballers
Spanish expatriates in England
Expatriate footballers in England